Bagneux station (French: Gare de Bagneux) is a station on the line B of the Réseau Express Régional, a hybrid suburban commuter and rapid transit line. The station takes its name from its location near the city of Bagneux, Hauts-de-Seine, but the station itself is inside the town of Cachan.

Railway situation
The station is located in Cachan, at the edge of the D920 (ex-RN20), named avenue Aristide-Briand at this point, the main north / south axis which marks the municipal and departmental limit with Bagneux.

It also bears the name of “Pont Royal”, a public road south of the station being called “avenue du Pont-Royal”. It is therefore one of the two RER stations in Cachan, the other being the Arcueil - Cachan station, at the edge of Arcueil, approximately 800 meters to the north, on the same line.

The station is in the classic configuration of two platforms surrounding 2 tracks. The only special case, being that the station is in a particularly tight curve, followed by a counter curve in a southerly direction, limiting the speed to 70 kph for semi-direct trains. The station is built with an open trench below the road. Access to the platforms is only via their southern end, where the passenger building is located, built above the two tracks.

The station is located at Kilometric Point (KP) 11 (point at the southern end of the station).

Connection

The station is served by:

Bus lines V3 of the "Valouette" bus network
and, at night, by line  of the Noctilien bus network.

Gallery

References

See also

 List of stations of the Paris RER
Réseau Express Régional stations
Bagneux
Railway stations in France opened in the 1830s